Zindagi Zindagi  is a 1972 Indian Hindi-language romance film directed by Tapan Sinha. The film stars Sunil Dutt, Deb Mukherjee, Waheeda Rehman, Farida Jalal and Ashok Kumar. The film revolves around life in a village hospital and has casteism as an issue at its core. It had a soundtrack by S. D. Burman, which fetched him a National Award for Best Music. It is a remake of Sinha's 1959 Bengali hit Khoniker Atithi.

Synopsis
 
This movie revolves around a village hospital that was built by a generous hearted man, Choudhury Ramprasad who is also a patient in the hospital. The other patients include Isamil, Dayaram, Ratan, and the doctor is Dr. Sunil. Amongst the patient is a singer, who loves Shyama a worker in the hospital. When Meeta Sharma comes to the hospital to admit her son, she meets Sunil who she loved during college days, but her uncle and aunt reject their marriage due to casteism and gets Meeta married to Brahmin Engineer who dies in a railway accident leaving Meeta with a five-year-old child Babu who becomes paralytic due to a fall from a staircase. In the background of the hospital atmosphere is an election in the village, which is proceeding smoothly, but causing a disturbance is Ramprasad's son Shiv Prasad. Ramprasad wins the election but on his death bed. Sunil gets Babu successfully operated but is unable to walk due to no confidence. Ratan a TB patient recovers and leaves the hospital with Shyama a hospital worker to get married. Shiv Prasad instigates everyone about an affair between Sunil and Meeta which is solved after a quarrel. Dr Sunil gets the confidence of Babu with the help of other children, who coax him to run around playfully, finally Babu starts walking and Meeta relents to an urging Dr Sunil to join him in the hospital services, so that both can raise Babu to be a doctor.

Cast
 Sunil Dutt as Dr. Sunil Singh
 Waheeda Rehman as Meeta Sharma
 Ramesh Deo as Shiv Prasad (Ram's son)
 Jalal Agha as Ratan (ex-soldier)
 Chaaya Devi as Mrs. Singh, Sunil's mother
 Anwar Hussain as Patient Dayaram
 Iftekhar as Patient Ismail 
 Farida Jalal as Shyama (Hospital Worker)
 Ashok Kumar as Ram Prasad (Hospital benefactor / Patient / Politician / Shiv's father)
 Deb Mukherjee as Heera (Patient / Singer)
 Mrinal Mukherjee as Compounder Kishore
 Nasir Khan as Principal Dr. Mukherjee
 Sameer Roy as Loknath (Social Activist)
 Ruby Meyers as Senior Matron
 Mukri as Ramu (Dr. Sunil's servant)
 Gajanan Jagirdar as Mr. Sharma (Meeta's uncle)
 Shyama as Chachi (Meeta's aunt)
 Chand Usmani as Leela
 Master Tito as Babu (Meeta's son)
 Mukri as Ramu (Sunil's servant)
 Narbada Shankar as Brahmin / Pandit
 Jankidas as Loknath's Assistant

Music
The songs are composed by Sachin Dev Burman and the lyrics are written by Anand Bakshi.
 "Zindagi Ai Zindagi" - Sachin Dev Burman
 "Khus Raho Sathiyo Khus Raho Sathiyo" - Kishore Kumar, Lata Mangeshkar
 "Mera Sab Kuch Mere Geet Re" - Manna Dey
 "Teri Jat Kya Hai, Meri Jat Kya Hai" - Kishore Kumar
 "Tune Hame Kya Diya Ri Jindagi" - Kishore Kumar
 "Kon Sacha Hai Kon Jhutha Hai" - Manna Dey
 "Piya Tune Kya Kiya Re" - Sachin Dev Burman

External links
 

1972 films
Hindi remakes of Bengali films
1970s Hindi-language films
1970s romance films
Films scored by S. D. Burman
Hindi-language romance films